Grupa Akrobacyjna Skorpion ("Scorpion" Aerobatic team) is  an aerobatic demonstration team of the aviation arm of the Polish Land Forces, flying 4 Mil Mi-24 Helicopters. It is one of the few helicopter aerobatic teams in the world and one of only 2 flying the Mi-24. Originally formed in 1999 at the 49th combat helicopters regiment in Pruszcz Gdański, the team made its début in 1999 at an air picnic in Pruszcz Gdański, and later performed at the 1999 Radom Air Show. 

The team is currently suspended, as some of its pilots are on duty in Afghanistan.

See also
 Orlik Aerobatic Team
 Team Iskry

External links
official page of 49th Battle Helicopters Regiment
Scorpion promotion video

Military units and formations established in 1999
Military units and formations of Poland
Aerobatic teams
1999 establishments in Poland